The 2010 European Badminton Championships were the 22nd tournament of the European Badminton Championships. They were held in Manchester, England, from April 14 to April 18, 2010, and they were organised by the Badminton Europe and the Badminton England. Venue of this event was the Manchester Evening News Arena.

Medalists

Results

Men's singles

Women's singles

Men's doubles

Women's doubles

Mixed doubles

* Carsten Mogensen was given a red card after the game for kicking his racquet into the crowd.

Medal count

External links
2010 European Championships
European Championships 2010 at tournamentsoftware.com

European Badminton Championships
European Badminton Championships
European Badminton Championships
Badminton tournaments in England
2010s in Manchester
International sports competitions in Manchester